The Hampton Kempton Waterworks Railway is a  gauge narrow gauge steam railway that opened in 2013, giving rides to paying visitors on a restored steam locomotive, with two back-up diesel locomotives. It is based on the site of an industrial railway that served Kempton Waterworks.

History 
The original  gauge railway, known as the Metropolitan Water Board Railway, was built between 1914 and 1916 to carry coal from a wharf on the River Thames to the furnaces of the regional water supply's pumping stations on the Hanworth/Hampton border. At its peak it carried 760 tons of coal a week. In 1945 the line closed, the trackbed becoming a road for maintenance workers. In May 2003, the Metropolitan Water Board Railway Society was formed with the intention of re-opening the railway as a  gauge passenger-carrying line between Hampton and the Kempton Great Engine House.

The chief executive of Thames Water attended the opening of the railway in 2013 (and hereditary building and civil engineering magnate Sir William McAlpine).

Operation 
The locomotive, with driver, hauls passengers in covered carriages. Each has four seats abreast and proper housing and ramp for a wheelchair. The first section of track is a loop, which operates on selected non-winter weekends. The steam locomotive being used is "Darent", built in 1903 (formerly of Provan Gas Works, Glasgow). Two diesel locomotives have added from a mine in Indonesia; they are in working order, but subject to some further restoration, so all trains are currently steam-hauled. 

The site has the sole Ransomes & Rapier crane nationally in working order..

Initially the project was loaned a suitable steam engine by London Museum of Water & Steam - enabling the Kempton Railway to open on schedule in May 2013.  The London Museum of Water & Steam also has a 400-yard section of alike track, open weekends. These form the two places in London for mid-size steam trains. At full size, seasonal trips such as the Cathedral Express operate on regular lines and "heritage" steam-engine lines, giving some mothballed lines a revival outside of London.

Fleet List

Further plans 
The planned second phase of the railway involves the construction of a further three miles of track, leading from the existing loop towards the Upper Sunbury Road, Hampton. This track will pass a reservoir. The restored track would run across land owned by Thames Water.  On Monday 19 March 2018, the lease to extend the railway was signed at a ceremony attended by the CEO of Thames Water Steve Robertson, the Deputy Mayor Hounslow, Mayor of Spelthorne, Deputy Mayor of Richmond upon Thames and members of the heritage railway not-for-profit company; planning permission is sought.

References

External links
Kempton Steam Railway - official website

2 ft gauge railways in England
Industrial railways in England